The World 100 is a 100-lap dirt late model racing event held every year since 1971 at the 1/2 mile Eldora Speedway in Rossburg, Ohio. it is considered by many race fans to be the most prestigious dirt late model event in the United States. The event is held on the weekend following Labor Day in mid September. In 1971 the winner received $3,000, and each year since then, the winner's purse has been raised by $1,000. The 2022 edition has a winner's prize of $55,000. In addition, the winning driver and owner earn a pair of coveted globed trophies.

Qualifying

Qualifying for the World 100 feature race is a 3-day event. Typically, the Thursday and Friday before the World 100 is filled with the prototypical event schedule (hot laps, heat races, B-Main/Last Chance Qualifier, Feature event). Both Thursday and Friday have Twin Features. Drivers earn points based on their performances the first two days. On Saturday (the day of the World 100), drivers are seeded into their heat races based on the points accumulated through the previous two days. How they finish in their heat races immediately determines where the predetermined number of qualifying drivers will start. A random draw will then invert a selected number of qualifiers starting from first to the said position.

This process saw Hudson O'Neal, son of legendary driver Don O'Neal, become the youngest driver to start on the pole at 17-years-old in 2017.

In 2018, both Friday and Saturday racing were rained out and moved from September to Columbus Day weekend in October. The results from Thursday were carried over to the rain date, and drivers ran Friday's schedule the morning of the World 100, essentially making the day a double-header. Tim McCreadie won the marathon event, becoming the first driver from New York to win the World 100.

In 2020, because of Ohio regulations on COVID-19, the race was repurposed as the Intercontinental Classic, which was reduced to 67 laps and purse reduced as a result of being behind closed doors. It became a pay-per-view event with a flat $50,000 to win (reduced from 2019).

Winners
 1971: Bruce Gould, Milford, Ohio.
 1972: Verlin Eaker, Cedar Rapids, Iowa; 
 1973: Floyd Gilbert, Lockland, Ohio; 
 1974: Ed Sanger, Waterloo, Iowa; 
 1975: Joe Merryfield, Des Moines, Iowa; 
 1976: Charlie Hughes, Dalton, Ga.; 
 1977: Doug Kenimer, Dalton, Ga.; 
 1978: Ken Walton, Viola, Iowa; 
 1979: Larry Moore, Dayton, Ohio; 
 1980: Charlie Swartz, Lucasville, Ohio; 
 1981: Larry Moore, Dayton, Ohio; 
 1982: Mike Duvall, Gaffney, S.C.; 
 1983: Jeff Purvis, Clarksville, Tenn.; 
 1984: Jeff Purvis, Clarksville, Tenn.; 
 1985: Larry Moore, Dayton, Ohio; 
 1986: Jeff Purvis, Clarksville, Tenn.; 
 1987: Randy Boggs, Grayson, Ky.; 
 1988: Scott Bloomquist, Mooresburg, Tenn.; 
 1989: Donnie Moran, Frazeysburg, Ohio; 
 1990: Scott Bloomquist, Mooresburg, Tenn.; 
 1991: Billy Moyer, Batesville, Ark.; 
 1992: Donnie Moran, Frazeysburg, Ohio; 
 1993: Billy Moyer, Batesville, Ark.; 
 1994: Billy Moyer, Batesville, Ark.; 
 1995: Jack Boggs, Grayson, Ky.; 
 1996: Donnie Moran, Dresden, Ohio; 
 1997: Donnie Moran, Dresden, Ohio; 
 1998: Billy Moyer, Batesville, Ark.; 
 1999: Steve Francis, Ashland, Ky.; 
 2000: Billy Moyer, Batesville, Ark.; 
 2001: Scott Bloomquist, Mooresburg, Tenn.; 
 2002: Brian Birkhofer, Muscatine, Iowa; 
 2003: Dan Schlieper, Pewaukee, Wis.; 
 2004: Chub Frank, Bear Lake, Pa.; 
 2005: Dale McDowell, Rossville, Ga.; 
 2006: Earl Pearson Jr., Jacksonville, Fla.; 
 2007: Jimmy Owens, Newport, Tenn.; 
 2008: Shane Clanton, Locust Grove, Ga.; 
 2009: Bart Hartman, Zanesville, Ohio; 
 2010: Billy Moyer, Batesville, Ark.; 
 2011: Jimmy Owens, Newport, Tenn.; 
 2012: Brian Birkhofer, Muscatine, Iowa; 
 2013: John Blankenship, Williamson, W.Va.; 
 2014: Scott Bloomquist, Mooresburg, Tenn.; 
 2015: Jonathan Davenport, Blairsville, Ga.; 
 2016: Bobby Pierce, Oakwood, Ill.; 
 2017: Jonathan Davenport, Blairsville, Ga.; 
 2018: Tim McCreadie, Watertown, NY.;
 2019: Jonathan Davenport, Blairsville, Ga.; 
 2020 (Intercontinental Classic):  Jonathan Davenport, Blairsville, Ga.; 
 2021 (Thu): Brandon Overton, Evans, Ga.
 2021 (Sat): Jonathan Davenport, Blairsville, Ga.;
 2022 Jonathan Davenport, Blairsville, Ga.;

References

2005 establishments in Ohio
Stock car races
Auto races in the United States
Dirt track racing in the United States
Recurring sporting events established in 2005
Motorsport in Ohio